Farnesyl-diphosphate farnesyltransferase 1 is a protein that in humans is encoded by the FDFT1 gene.

Function

This gene encodes a membrane-associated enzyme located at a branch point in the mevalonate pathway. The encoded protein is the first specific enzyme in cholesterol biosynthesis, catalyzing the dimerization of two molecules of farnesyl diphosphate in a two-step reaction to form squalene.

References

Further reading